Park Hyatt Hyderabad is a luxury hotel located in the Banjara Hills neighbourhood of Hyderabad, India that opened on 29 April 2012.
Built on an area of  the Hotel is the first urban Park Hyatt in India and 29th hotel in the Park Hyatt portfolio.

History 
Built across on an area of  the construction of the hotel started in 2006. Owned by Gayatri Hi-tech Hotels and managed by Hyatt, the hotel was inaugurated on 29 April 2012 costing Rs 7 billion approximately.

The Hotel 
The Hotel has 185 rooms, 24 suites on the first six floors and 42 furnished service apartments called The Residence on the top two floors. The residences are pet friendly and guests can stay with their pets. Each of the hotel’s guestrooms are among the largest in Hyderabad, measuring at least 463 square feet. The lobby is designed with sparkling water feature and plants that surround a 35-foot tall white abstract sculpture. Park Hyatt Hyderabad is the first hotel in India to feature Hyatt’s residential-style meeting concept named The Manor. Accommodating a range of dining the hotel has a Lobby Lounge - The Living Room, The Dining Room – All Day Dining Restaurant, Tre-Forni Bar & Restaurant - Northern Italian Cuisine, Rika – Asian Cuisine. The Hotel is also equipped with Spa & Fitness Facilities.

Art collection 
The Park Hyatt Hyderabad owns a contemporary art collection composed of various international artists’ paintings: B2Fays (29 paintings, including 5 series of 20 meters long), Anuradha Thakur, N Ramachandran, Y Shivaramacharry, David Sequiera, Udaya Chiluveru, Anamika V, Ramana Reddy, Y Shivaramacharry, Ritu Purana Das, Hetal Chudasama, Ashoke Mullick, Jaya Javeri, Kiran Kumar, Ravi, Laxman Aelay, Atul Bhalla, Matthieu Faury, Mohammed Osman, Ramesh V, Chippa Sudhakar, Manohar C, G Anjaneyulu, Devyani Parikh, Laxma Goud.

Events 
The Hotel was a venue for events and conferences such as UNWTO, TATA We- connect, Malaysian Trade High commission, HAL parliamentary and interactive art installation "Via presence" by B2Fays.
The Hotel is also the official hospitality partner of IPL team Sunrisers Hyderabad.

References

Further reading
24 April 2012 Park Hyatt restaurants opened, The Hindu
HYDERABAD, 8 April 2012 Luxury has a new address, The Hindu
Amit Dixit The understated façade of the Park Hyatt Hyderabad, Travel Outlook India
Mark Caswell on 3 April 2012
Stephanie Johnnidis on 6 April 2012 Park Hyatt Hyderabad Opens in Southern India, Fodors Travel
Sunday, 6 October 2013 by HBI Staff AP govt awards, Hospitality Biz India

External links
Official Website of Park Hyatt Hyderabad

Hotels in Hyderabad
Hyatt Hotels and Resorts
Hotel buildings completed in 2012
Hotels in India